Piazza Émile Chanoux is a city square in Aosta, Italy.

Piazzas in Aosta Valley
Aosta